Nebria mannerheimi is a species of ground beetle in the Nebriinae subfamily that can be found in Canada and the United States, where it can be found in such states as Alaska, Idaho, and Oregon.

References

mannerheimi
Beetles described in 1828
Beetles of North America